Asian Institute of International Financial Law (AIIFL) is a Think-Tank attached to the Faculty of Law, The University of Hong Kong(HKU).

AIIFL has played a leading role in HKU’s development as a global leader in FinTech and RegTech in research and teaching.

History

During his tenure at HKU, Professor Joseph J. Norton, along with Professor Say Goo, Professor Douglas W. Arner and other colleagues working in the area of commercial, corporate and financial law, led the establishment of AIIFL at the Faculty of Law in July 1999.

AIIFL was established to assist the Faculty of Law in developing a partnership with other units at HKU and with the local business and financial communities for establishing a leading Asian academic centre in the area of international commercial, corporate and financial law.

HKU FinTech
AIIFL’s key initiatives include "HKU EDX Introduction To FinTech", a Massive Open Online Course (MOOC) with edX, spread across every country in the world.

References

External links 
 AIIFL

Law schools in Hong Kong
Education in Hong Kong
University of Hong Kong